The Awards and decorations of the German Armed Forces are decorations awarded by the German Bundeswehr, the German government, and other organizations to the German military and allied forces. Modern era German military awards have been presented since the establishment of the Federal Republic of Germany in 1949.

History
The history of modern German Armed Forces awards may be divided into three distinct eras, namely post-World War II, Cold War era, and modern day.

Post World War II

At the end of the Second World War, the wear of all Nazi era decorations was prohibited. When Germany divided in two, East Germany continued to ban such awards. However, from 1957 West German regulations permitted the wear of many wartime awards in Bundeswehr uniform, provided the swastika symbol was removed. This led to the re-design of many awards with, for example, the swastika being replaced by a three-leafed oakleaf cluster on the Iron Cross. Neck decorations and pin-back badges were now worn in Bundeswehr uniform on the ribbon bar. Those decorations that did not have a ribbon were displayed by a small replica of the award on a field grey ribbon.

Nazi political awards, those directly associated with the SA or SS, as well as occupation service medals relating to the expansion of Nazi Germany in the 1930s, continued to be forbidden and could not be worn.

Cold War Era

During the 1960s, West Germany became a key NATO member, serving as a major base for forward deployed United States and allied forces along the border with the Eastern Bloc. During this time, the West German government began to introduce new military awards and decorations, most of them for non-combat meritorious service.

Chief among these was the Order of Merit, the principal order of Germany. Civil relief medals were also introduced into the German armed forces, beginning in 1962 with the first in series of Flood Relief Medals.

By the 1970s, German personnel were also eligible to receive foreign awards, most notable awards and decorations of the United States military. During the 1980s, the NATO Medal and United Nations Medal were also frequently awarded to German personnel.

Modern Day Awards
In the modern German armed forces, several combat service medals exist to reflect German deployment in overseas missions in the War on Terror and NATO-United Nations Peacekeeping ventures. German personnel are also eligible to receive and wear civil service medals, sports and fitness awards, and certain marksmanship awards.

The reunification of Germany saw new regulations concerning the status of East German awards introduced into the German military. These regulations typically stipulated that awards associated with the Communist regime were prohibited from display, but did recognize the status and continued wear of certain non-political service medals.

List of German awards

Decorations awarded by the president of the Federal Republic of Germany
 German Order of Merit
Eichendorff-Plakette
Grubenwehr-Ehrenzeichen (Mine rescue service badge of honor)
Pro-Musica-Plakette
Silbermedaille für den Behindertensport (silver medal for the disabled sports)
Silbernes Lorbeerblatt
Sportplakette des Bundespräsidenten (sports plaque of the federal president)
Zelter-Plakette

Decorations awarded by the Federal Minister of Defence
 Bundeswehr Cross of Honour for Valour
 Badge of Honour of the Bundeswehr
 Combat Action Medal of the Bundeswehr
 German Armed Forces Deployment Medal

Decorations awarded by the Federal Minister of Interior 

 Decoration of the German Federal Agency for Technical Relief
 Afghanistan-Spange

Decorations awarded by the Federal Ministers of Interior and Defence 

 German Flood Service Medal (2002) – Service in the 2002 German Floods
 German Flood Service Medal (2013) – Service in the 2013 European floods

Authorized Second World War Decorations
 Iron Cross, (including the Knight's Cross)
 War Merit Cross, (including the Knight's Cross)
 German Cross
 Wound Badge
 Wehrmacht Qualification Badges (ribbon format)
 Wehrmacht Combat Clasps (ribbon format)
 Tank Destruction Badge (ribbon format)
 Campaign shields
 Campaign cuff titles
 Eastern Front Medal
 Wehrmacht Long Service Awards
 Eastern People's Medal
 German Olympic Decoration

Sports Decorations
 German Armed Forces Badge for Military Proficiency
 German Sports Badge
 German rescue swimming badge
 Cross for the Four Day Marches (Netherlands)

Qualification insignia

German Pilot Badge
Parachutist Badge
Commando Badge
 German Naval Qualification Badges
 Air Force Protection Badge
German Marksmanship Lanyards

Foreign awards
 NATO Medal
 Serge Lazareff Prize
 United Nations Medal
 United Nations Special Service Medal
 United Nations Medal for Service with United Nations Peace Forces (UNPF)
 Awards and decorations of allied countries, including the USA and France

See also
 Orders, decorations, and medals of the German Empire
 Orders, decorations, and medals of East Germany
 Orders, decorations, and medals of Nazi Germany

References
 Modern German Medals
 Dietrich Maerz/Bernd Hartmann, "Awards of the Heer, Vol. I", 2012, 

Military awards and decorations of Germany (Bundeswehr)
German military-related lists